Damian Sawczak (13 July 1847 – 29 December 1912) was a Ukrainian judge in Halychyna (Zalishchyky, Khodoriv, Husiatyn). Member of Diet of Galicia and Lodomeria.  At a meeting of regional Galician Diet on March 3, 1892 he proposed to open a state gymnasium in Buchach with studying in Ukrainian language.

1847 births
1912 deaths
Ukrainian judges